Guy Parker-Rees is a British illustrator and author of children's books.

Biography 
Parker-Rees studied Literature and Philosophy at York University. He currently lives in Brighton with his wife and three children. Before becoming a children's book author and illustrator, Parker-Rees worked as an art teacher for people with learning difficulties and as an art therapist in a social services day center. Parker-Rees's work includes illustrating for other writers, most notably Giles Andreae, as well as creating his own children's books. His name featured on the lists of the top 50 most borrowed illustrators from UK public libraries from July 2015 – June 2016.

Giraffes Can't Dance 
Giraffes Can't Dance is Parker-Rees's most successful picture book, an international bestseller on amazon.co.uk and number one bestselling picture book in the United States. As of March 2019, it has sold over four million copies worldwide.

Other books 

Be Brave Little Penguin
Dylan The Doctor
Dylan The Shopkeeper
Twist and Hop Minibeast Bop
Fabulous Pie
Never Ask a Dinosaur to Dinner
Tom and Millie's Whizzy Busy People
Tom and Millie's Great Big Treasure Hunt
Diggory Digger and the Dinosaurs
The Jungle Run
Ants In Your Pants
Jolly Olly Octopus
Farmer Joe and the Music Show
All Afloat on Noah's Boat
The Chimpanzees of Happytown
Perky Little Penguins
Bumpus Jumpus Dinosaurumpus
Down By the Cool of the Pool
K is for Kissing a Cool Kangaroo
Spookyrumpus
Along Came a Bedtime
Ducky Dives In
Come to Tea on Planet Zum-Zee
Quiet!
The Hippo-not-amus
Big Bad Bunny
Little Jim Lost

Awards and honours 

Sheffield Book Award 2016
 Giraffes Can't Dance
 Spookyrumpus

Portsmouth Book award
 Giraffes Can't Dance
 Spookyrumpus

Blue Peter Book Award shortlist 2004

 Quiet!

FCBG Children's Book Award 2016
 Fabulous Pie

References

External links 
 Official website
 Guy Parker-Rees at Library of Congress Authorities, with 16 catalogue records
 Q&A with Guy Parker-Rees for World Book Day (UK and Ireland)
 Books for Young Children about the creative arts on JSTOR
 International Reading association's Children's Choices for 2002
 The New York Times – Illustrated Books to Help Children Embrace Their Differences
Time – Here Are the 5 Most Popular Books to Give to Kids This Year

1959 births
Living people
British illustrators
British children's writers
British children's book illustrators